Felsőkelecsény is a village in Borsod-Abaúj-Zemplén County in northeastern Hungary. , it had a population of 420. The village is located in the valley of Csörgős with the neighbour villages Zubogy and Felsőnyárád. Felsőkelecsény also has a road connection with Rudabánya to the east.

References

Populated places in Borsod-Abaúj-Zemplén County